Can You Whistle, Johanna? is a 1992 Ulf Stark children's book, which was also made into a film in 1994. It was nominated for the August Prize in 1992, and was awarded with Heffaklumpen and Deutscher Jugendliteraturpreis.

It has also been translated into English by Gecko Press.

Plot
Berra wants to have, and finds, a grandfather.

References

1992 children's books
Works by Ulf Stark
Swedish novels adapted into films